The Daniel Knight Warren House is a house located in Warrenton, Oregon, that is listed on the National Register of Historic Places.   Daniel Knight Warren was an Oregon pioneer born in Bath, New York on March 12, 1836.

See also
 National Register of Historic Places listings in Clatsop County, Oregon

References

1885 establishments in Oregon
Houses completed in 1885
Houses in Clatsop County, Oregon
Houses on the National Register of Historic Places in Oregon
National Register of Historic Places in Clatsop County, Oregon
Stick-Eastlake architecture in Oregon
Victorian architecture in Oregon